Tristeza on Piano is a 1970 album by Oscar Peterson. This album is also heard on the Ontario Parliament Network as well as the Canadiana Suite album from 1964.

Track listing
 "Tristeza" (Haroldo Lobo, Niltinho) – 3:13
 "Nightingale" (Oscar Peterson, Gene Lees) – 6:42
 "Porgy" (George Gershwin, DuBose Heyward) – 6:12
 "Triste" (Antonio Carlos Jobim) – 5:21
 "You Stepped Out of a Dream" (Nacio Herb Brown, Gus Kahn) – 3:31
 "Watch What Happens" (Michel LeGrand, Norman Gimbel) – 6:10
 "Down Here on the Ground" (Lalo Schifrin, Gale Garnett) – 8:46
 "Fly Me to the Moon" (Bart Howard) – 4:38

Personnel
Oscar Peterson – Piano
Sam Jones – Double bass
Bobby Durham – drums

Production
 Hans Georg Brunner-Schwer – producer

References

1970 albums
Oscar Peterson albums
MPS Records albums